Gaius Octavius (fl. 216 BC) was a Roman army officer who was active during the third century BC. He was the son of the equestrian Gaius Octavius and grandson of the quaestor Gnaeus Octavius Rufus, also the father of Velitrae's magistrate Gaius Octavius, grandfather of praetor Gaius Octavius and great-grandfather of Roman emperor Augustus (reigning 27 BC - 14 AD). When Marcus Antonius tried to show his contempt against Augustus, he said that Octavius was a freedman and rope-maker from Thurii.

During the Second Punic War, Octavius served as military tribune and participated in the disastrous battle of Cannae, being one of few survivors. When the Carthaginians marched into the Roman camp, Octavius and his colleague, tribune P. Sempronius Tuditanus, managed to cut their way through the enemy and arrived safely in Canusium. He served in Sicilia (modern Sicily) under the praetor Lucius Aemilius Papus in 205 BC, but it is unknown whether he took part in some other expedition.

See also 
 Octavia (gens)

References

Bibliography 

 
 

3rd-century BC Romans
Octavii Rufi